Who'll Stop the Rain is a 1978 American crime film directed by Karel Reisz and starring Nick Nolte, Tuesday Weld, Michael Moriarty, and Anthony Zerbe. It was released by United Artists and produced by Herb Jaffe and Gabriel Katzka with Sheldon Schrager and Roger Spottiswoode as executive producers. The screenplay was by Judith Rascoe and Robert Stone, based on Stone's novel Dog Soldiers (1974), the music score by Laurence Rosenthal, and the cinematography by Richard H. Kline. The movie was entered in the 1978 Cannes Film Festival.

Plot
The film opens in Saigon at the height of the Vietnam War.

John Converse, a disillusioned war correspondent, approaches Ray Hicks, a merchant marine sailor and acquaintance of Converse from the U.S., for help in smuggling a large quantity of heroin from Vietnam to San Francisco, where he will exchange the drugs for payment with Converse's wife Marge, who has become addicted to Dilaudid.

When Hicks gets back to the U.S. and discovers he is being followed by thugs connected either to Converse or his suppliers, he goes on the run with Marge and the heroin, and eventually they are pursued by corrupt DEA Agent Antheil, who initially set the deal in motion. As Marge is separated from her supply of Dilaudid, she experiences withdrawal, and Hicks decides to help wean her off her addiction by using the heroin. Hicks also attempts to find another buyer for the heroin before his pursuers can catch up to him.

Cast

 Nick Nolte as Ray Hicks
 Tuesday Weld as Marge Converse
 Michael Moriarty as John Converse
 Anthony Zerbe as Antheil
 Richard Masur as Danskin
 Ray Sharkey as Smitty
 Gail Strickland as Charmian
 Charles Haid as Eddie Peace
 David Opatoshu as Bender
 Joaquín Martínez as Angel (as Joaquin Martinez)
 James Cranna as Gerald
 Timothy Blake as Jody
 Shelby Balik as Janey
 Jean Howell as Edna
 José Carlos Ruiz as Galindez (as Jose Carlos Ruiz)

Background and production 
The film is based on Robert Stone's novel Dog Soldiers (1974), which won the National Book Award (US) for fiction in 1975. For its original US theatrical release it was re-titled Who'll Stop the Rain, after the Creedence Clearwater Revival song, which features prominently (along with several other popular CCR tracks) on the film's soundtrack. The film was released as Dog Soldiers in several places. Some copies of the DVD of Who'll Stop the Rain contain prints titled Dog Soldiers.

Stone based the character of Ray Hicks on Beat writer Neal Cassady, with whom Stone became acquainted through novelist Ken Kesey, a graduate school classmate of Stone's at Stanford University.

Hicks' death scene on the railroad tracks at the film's conclusion is directly based on Cassady's death along a railroad track outside of San Miguel de Allende, Mexico, in 1968. The hippie commune setting, where lights and stereo speakers placed throughout the woods are utilized in Hicks' escape plan, is partially based on Kesey's home in La Honda, California, where Kesey and his friends — known as the Merry Pranksters — famously wired the surrounding woods with lights and sound equipment to enhance their experiments with LSD.

The Saigon scenes were filmed on a set in Mexico. There was a casting advertisement in Mexico City for people of any Asian background to represent the Vietnamese.

Awards
 Nominee, Palme d'Or Cannes Film Festival (Karel Reisz)
 Nominee, Best Actor National Society of Film Critics (Nick Nolte)
 Nominee, Best Adapted Drama Writers Guild of America (Judith Rascoe, Robert Stone)

Soundtrack 
 Del Reeves - "Philadelphia Fillies"
 Jackie DeShannon - "Put a Little Love in Your Heart"
 Don McLean - "American Pie"
 Slim Whitman - "I'll Step Down"
 Creedence Clearwater Revival - "Hey Tonight"
 Creedence Clearwater Revival - "Who'll Stop the Rain"
 Creedence Clearwater Revival - "Proud Mary"
 The Spencer Davis Group - "Gimme Some Lovin'"
 Hank Snow - "Golden Rocket"

References

External links

1978 films
1978 crime drama films
American chase films
American crime drama films
American crime thriller films
Films about drugs
Films about the illegal drug trade
Films directed by Karel Reisz
Films based on American novels
Films based on military novels
Films shot in Mexico
United Artists films
Vietnam War films
Works by Robert Stone (novelist)
Films scored by Laurence Rosenthal
American neo-noir films
Films about heroin addiction
1970s English-language films
1970s American films